The 1989 Singapore Open, also known as the Konica Cup - The Invitational Asian Badminton Championships, took place from 21 ~ 26 February 1989 at the Singapore Badminton Hall in Singapore. It was the third and final edition of this event before it returned to the open invitation format of 1973. This was also the last time that the tournament was held at the Singapore Badminton Hall before the organiser move the event to the newly built Singapore Indoor Stadium at Kallang in 1990. The total prize money on offer was US$42,000.

Venue
Singapore Badminton Hall

Final results

References 

Badminton Asia Championships
Singapore Open (badminton)
1989 in badminton
1989 in Singaporean sport